The discography of German synthpop band And One consists of 12 studio albums, 2 live albums, 2 compilation albums, 1 video album, 5 extended plays, 21 singles, and 17 music videos. And One was formed in 1989 by Steve Naghavi and Chris Ruiz, who met at a club in Berlin. Their first single, "Metalhammer", was considered a "significant club hit". Alex Two joined the group prior to the release of their first album, Anguish, which was released in 1991 by Machinery Records.

Albums

Studio albums

Live albums

Compilation albums

Extended plays

Singles

Videography

Video albums

References

Discographies of German artists
Pop music group discographies